Pasgoda Divisional Secretariat is a  Divisional Secretariat  of Matara District, of Southern Province, Sri Lanka.

References
 Divisional Secretariats Portal

Divisional Secretariats of Matara District